Joseph Shallit (February 7, 1915—June 13, 1995) was an American mystery novelist and science fiction author. He was the son of Russian-Jewish immigrants from Vitebsk (now in Belarus), born in Philadelphia under the name Joseph Shaltz. This name was the result of a clerical error affecting his parents when they emigrated from Russia, and he changed it back to "Shallit" in November 1942.

He was instrumental in getting the regulation against photography in Independence Hall changed when he was arrested for taking a photo of the Liberty Bell in 1942. He was a reporter at the time for The Philadelphia Record. Subsequent to this event, the rule was changed.

Shallit served in the Army Signal Corps in the Philippines during World War II. Upon his return, he began to write, publishing his first mystery, The Billion-Dollar Body, in 1947 with Lippincott. Other mysteries include Yell Bloody Murder, Lady, Don't Die on My Doorstep, and Kiss the Killer.  Take Your Last Look was published under the pseudonym "Matt Brady".  He also wrote a number of short stories for science fiction magazines, including "Education of a Martian", in the August 1952 issue of Galaxy Science Fiction.  A short story, entitled "Margie Passes", was published in Whit Burnett's collection Story, and later adapted by John Tobias into one segment of a 1972 ABC television drama produced by Fred Coe, entitled "Of Men and Women" and starring Deborah Raffin.

Shallit later worked for Pennsylvania Railroad (later Conrail), editing an employee magazine that they published. He retired in 1980, and died of Alzheimer's disease on June 13, 1995.

He was married to Louise Lee Outlaw Shallit, an author, and was survived by two sons, Jonathan Shallit, a music professor and Jeffrey Shallit, a computer scientist.

References
Jeffrey Shallit: About Joseph Shallit

External links
Joseph Shallit biography at Ramble House
Interview with Joseph Shallit in July 1967

1915 births
1995 deaths
20th-century American novelists
American male novelists
American mystery writers
American science fiction writers
American people of Belarusian-Jewish descent
Jewish American novelists
Writers from Philadelphia
American male short story writers
20th-century American short story writers
20th-century American male writers
Novelists from Pennsylvania
20th-century American Jews
Central High School (Philadelphia) alumni